Susan Bitter Smith (born 1956) is currently the vice-president of Technical Solutions, and executive director Arizona/New Mexico Cable Communications Association.  She is a registered Republican in the state of Arizona, and has held multiple public offices.  She served as Chairman of the Arizona Corporation Commission., but resigned in December 2015 amid controversy.  Prior to serving on the ACC, she was president of the Central Arizona Project. Prior to that, she was Vice Mayor of the city of Scottsdale, Arizona.  She also served as a member for American Society of Association Executives (past chair, Key Award winner, Women Who Advance Excellence award winner and fellow).  Her other memberships have included service on the St. Theresa Catholic School Development Board, and presidency of the ASU Walter Cronkite Endowment Board (1998–1999)

Education 
Bitter Smith received her bachelor's degree from Arizona State University in 1977.  In 1982 she graduated from Arizona State with her M.B.A.  After graduating she remained active with the school as honorary chair of the ASU MBA Alumni Association.  In 2003, she received the Alumni Achievement Award.

Previous work history

President of the Central Arizona Project (2007–2011) 
During Bitter Smith's tenure as president, she was involved with the federal finalization of the Gila River Indian Community Water Rights Settlement.  This settlement was the largest Indian water rights settlement in U.S. history and went into full effect in 2008. U.S. Senator Jon Kyl was the primary sponsor of the legislation pertinent to the settlement. Bitter Smith commented on the work:

The work started during Grady Gammage's term as president and continued by Bill Perry, was finalized during my term as we finally resolved the Gila River Indian Community Water Rights Settlement...

The legislation was signed by President Bush in 2004, but was not fully implemented until "all actions necessary to complete the Gila River Indian Community Water Rights Settlement and amend the Southern Arizona Water Rights Settlement of 1982" had been accomplished.

Balsz Elementary School Board (2005–2008)

City Council, Scottsdale, Arizona (1988–1992) 
Bitter Smith served as a councilmember from 1988 to 1992.  During that time she participated on the Charter Review Advisory Committee, Council District Advisory Task Force, and Charter Review Task Force

Controversy
Recently, Bitter Smith received significant media attention regarding a complaint filed against her with Arizona Attorney General Mark Brnovich for conflict of interest. On September 15, 2015, in an article titled "Susan Bitter Smith Should Resign," the Arizona Republic wrote, "The Susan Bitter Smith death watch has officially begun." Bitter Smith announced she would be resigning from the Commission effective January 4, 2016.

Bitter Smith has lobbied for the telecommunications industry, but also regulated the telecommunications industry.  Bitter-Smith defended her position:

"As I have long said, I am not now nor have I ever been employed by a regulated entity," her statement said. "I am not paid by a regulated entity. I have not lobbied for a regulated entity. There is a policy issue at stake here: how far should conflict of interest rules extend? Should they extend to holdings by your retirement plan; should they apply to investments in your company or state retirement funds; should they apply to anyone who is a customer of a regulated entity; or should they apply to anyone who has received a rebate or discount from a regulated entity? The complaint is broad enough to be read to exclude almost anyone from serving on the Commission or any state office."

Bitter Smith is listed as a lobbyist for the cable industry and the telecommunications industry in the Arizona Capital Times Book of Lobbyists for years 2013, 2014 and 2015. She joined the Corporation Commission, which regulates the telecommunications industry, in 2013.

Attorney General investigation 
As of 2015, the Arizona Attorney General's office began investigating a complaint that seeks to have Bitter Smith removed from the Arizona Corporation Commission due to conflict-of-interest issues. As chair of the commission, Bitter Smith was in charge of regulating the telecommunications industry. At the same time, she worked as a lobbyist for the industry.

In addition to serving on the Arizona Corporation Commission, Bitter Smith managed her own public relations firm called Technical Solutions. In 2015, she served as a lobbyist for the Scottsdale National Golf Club. The golf club wanted a zoning change that would require the Arizona Public Service Company (APS). to move a half-built electrical substation. APS is regulated by the Arizona Corporation Commission. (Bitter Smith was the chair of the commission).

Due to Bitter Smith representing the golf club while simultaneously serving as chair of the Corporation Commission, Arizona attorney Tom Ryan filed a complaint against her with the Arizona Attorney General's office, seeking to have her removed from the commission.

During her lobbying efforts, Bitter Smith contacted residents in the affected neighborhood, along with the neighborhood's homeowner's association, located near the electrical substation. A member of the homeowner's association told Arizona's NBC Channel 12 news:

She treated us like we were morons.

In the Channel 12 TV story, reporter Brahm Resnik said:

This is a very serious allegation. A public official who is elected to oversee APS is accused of clearing the way for an APS power station—not for the public's benefit, but for the benefit of her paying client. That alleged conflict of interest could cost Susan Bitter Smith her job.

She announced her resignation on December 17, effective January 4, 2016.
After resigning her position over the alleged conflict of interest, Bitter Smith was not have charged by the Office of Attorney General. Citing his own real conflict of interest, Andy Tobin, Governor Doug Ducey's nominee to replace Bitter Smith on the Commission, said he would not vote on certain utility issues, having confirmed that his son-in-law works for Solar City, an electric utility the Commission regulates. Recusals on electric utility issues before the Commission could very well result in deadlocked votes and null decisions.

Brnovich had said, "There has to be somebody in the state who is willing to do the hard cases, to do the hard thing, even though it may be challenging personally or professionally, and that's to hold other public officials accountable," adding, "If it's not the attorney general's office, who is it?"

Bitter Smith's lobbying firm 
Bitter Smith and her husband own Technical Solutions. It is a public affairs firm. The company described itself on its website as a "full service government affairs services including direct federal, state and local lobbying activities with agencies ranging from the Federal Communications Commission, to the Arizona Corporation Commission, to the Arizona Legislature and Arizona municipalities."

The description from Technical Solution's website was removed after Ryan filed the complaint against Bitter Smith.

See also

 United States House of Representatives elections in Arizona, 2010#District 5

References

External links 
 Mrs Bitter-Smith's website

Living people
Arizona Republicans
Politicians from Scottsdale, Arizona
American political candidates
1956 births